Jerome Kelvyn Damon (born 4 April 1972) is a retired South African football referee.

He was voted PSL Referee of the Season in 2004–05 and 2008–09.

An international referee since 2000, Damon was on stand-by for the 2006 FIFA World Cup, and was a referee at the 2004, 2006, 2008 and 2010 Africa Cup of Nations.

He was preselected as a referee for the 2010 FIFA World Cup.

References

1972 births
Living people
South African soccer referees
Sportspeople from Cape Town
Cape Coloureds
2010 FIFA World Cup referees